Max Adler (born January 17, 1986) is an American actor. He is best known for his role as Dave Karofsky on the television series Glee (2009–2015).

Early life
Adler was born to a Jewish family in Queens, New York, the eldest son of Lisa (née Kobrin) and Doug Adler.  A year after Adler was born, his family relocated to Fountain Hills, Arizona, then to Scottsdale, Arizona. Adler attended Horizon High School, where he was a First Chair All-State show choir member. After graduating, he moved to Los Angeles to pursue a career in acting. Adler has a younger brother named Jake, born in 1992.

Career
After various roles in a number of productions, Adler was cast in a minor recurring role in the Fox television series Glee as school jock and bully Dave Karofsky. Glee creator Ryan Murphy was impressed with his acting and wanted to write more with him. In the November 2010 episode "Never Been Kissed", written to tackle the issue of LGBT youth bullying, Karofsky is revealed to be a closeted gay teen. Adler had previously questioned his character's motivations, but was surprised by the scene in which Karofsky kisses the object of his bullying, openly gay student Kurt Hummel (Chris Colfer). He received a positive response via the social networking websites Twitter, Tumblr and Facebook, and commented that he was "glad to represent such a large group of people". He expanded on this, saying, "I've gotten so many messages from people all around the world these last couple of days thanking me because either they are Karofsky, they were Karofsky or they know a Karofsky." The character eventually gives up his bullying and makes his peace with Kurt, but he remains closeted. Adler has been praised for his performance in episode 3x14, "On My Way", during which, after his character is outed, he attempts suicide.

Adler is a resident artist with The Porters of Hellsgate theatre company in Los Angeles, appearing in three Shakespearean productions with them since 2008.

From 2014 to 2017, Adler had a recurring role as Tank, Bay's college friend on Switched at Birth.

In 2014, Adler played the role of Baker in the religious satire Believe Me.

Activism
Following the Glee episode "Never Been Kissed", Adler was contacted by the It Gets Better Project, an internet based project founded by Dan Savage and his husband, Terry Miller, which aims to prevent suicide among LGBT youth. Adler recorded a heartfelt video for the project, offering words of hope and encouragement for kids and teens facing bullying due to their sexual orientation. Through playing one of the most well-known bullies on television, Adler offers viewers insight and advice, telling viewers, "most bullies are extremely insecure, and want to knock you down a peg to feel better about themselves. So, being who you are is what's awesome. It's what makes you special, interesting, fun to talk to, [and] desirable."

On November 15, 2010, Adler spoke at the Anti-Defamation League Concert Against Hate at the Kennedy Center in Washington, D.C.

Adler has also worked with the FSHD Society and MDA to help raise awareness for facioscapulohumeral muscular dystrophy (FSHD) and other hereditary muscle diseases. Adler's mother and grandmother suffered from relatively severe forms of FSHD. Because of the support that his mother gave him in becoming an actor, he feels that devoting time to raising money for MDA is a way for him to return the favor to her.

Adler, under "Team Max" is the host of the Celebrity Charity Walk 'n' Roll for FSHD to help raise funds directly for research of FSHD, one of the most prevalent muscular dystrophies. The walk is for the benefit of the FSHD Society, which is the largest grassroots organization of its kind solely dedicated to finding a treatment or cure for FSHD.

Personal life
In 2012, Adler became engaged to his longtime girlfriend Jennifer Bronstein; he proposed while they were visiting Rome. They were married on December 19, 2015. In January 2020, he announced that they were expecting their first child together.  On March 27, 2020, the couple welcomed their first child, Dylan Remington.

Filmography

Film

Television

References

External links

 

1986 births
Living people
21st-century American male actors
American male film actors
American male television actors
Jewish American male actors
Male actors from Scottsdale, Arizona
21st-century American Jews